The following is a comprehensive list of South Korean boy band Stray Kids' concert tours. The group has embarked on two headlining concert tours, two one-off concerts, one promotional tour, two showcases, and three fan meetings.

Concert tours

World Tour "District 9: Unlock" (2019–2020)

On September 30, 2019, Stray Kids announced their first world tour, titled World Tour "District 9: Unlock" during teasing their single "Double Knot". It would be held from November 23 to 24 at Olympic Hall, Songpa-gu, Seoul. The United States leg was announced on December 4, and Asia and Europe legs on January 14, comprising 24 shows, but the two later were cancelled or postponed due to the COVID-19 pandemic.

Set list
This set list is representative of the November 23–24, 2019 shows in Seoul. It does not represent all shows in the concert series.
{{hidden
| headercss = background: #ccccff; font-size: 100%; width: 65%;
| contentcss = text-align: left; font-size: 100%; width: 75%;
| header = Set list in Seoul
| content =

 "District 9"
 "Victory Songs"
 "Question"
 "Rock"
 "Side Effects"
 "Beware"
 "M.I.A"
 "Wow" (Lee Know, Hyunjin, Felix)
 "Mixtape#4"
 "Get Cool"
 "Awkward Silence"
 "My Universe" (Seungmin, I.N featuring Changbin)
 "3rd Eye"
 "I Am You" (ballad version)
 "We Go" (Bang Chan, Changbin, Han)
 "Road Not Taken"
 "TMT"
 "My Pace"
 "Double Knot"
 "Boxer"
 "Hellevator"
 "Miroh"
Encore
 "Grow Up"
 "Astronaut" (November 23) / "Rock" (November 24)
 "Yayaya"

Notes
 Since January 29, 2020 show, "Levanter" was included on the set list, placed between "Awkward Silence" and "My Universe", and in the encore part, "Astronaut" or "Rock" were replaced by "Miroh" and moved to be the last song to perform.
}}

Shows

2nd World Tour "Maniac" (2022–2023)

One-off concerts

Unlock: Go Live In Life (2020)

On October 19, 2020, Stray Kids announced their first online one-off concert, titled Unlock: Go Live In Life, being described as the upgrade version of the group's first World Tour "District 9: Unlock", which most shows were canceled and postponed due to COVID-19 pandemic. It was held on November 22, broadcasting through V Live (Beyond Live).

Set list

This set list is representative of the November 22, 2020 show.

 "District 9"
 "Victory Song"
 "Question"
 "Side Effects"
 "Double Knot"
 "M.I.A."
 "Wow" (Lee Know, Hyunjin, Felix)
 "My Universe" (Seungmin, I.N featuring Changbin)
 "Mixtape#4"
 "Blueprint"
 "God's Menu"
 "All In" (Korean version)
 "Ex"
 "I Am You" (ballad version)
 "We Go" (Bang Chan, Changbin, Han)
 "Easy"
 "My Pace"
 "Back Door"
 "Boxer"
 "Hellevator"
 "Miroh"
 "Ta"

Notes
  denotes the show having Multi-cam On.

Promotional tours

Hi-Stay Tour in Korea (2019)

On March 18, 2019, Stray Kids announce their national promotional tour, Hi-Stay Tour in Korea, before the release of the group's fourth EP Clé 1: Miroh, to communicate with their fans. It was held in Busan, Daejeon, and Incheon in March, and Seoul in April, titled "Hi-Stay Tour Finale in Seoul".

Set list
This set list is representative of the April 20, 2019 shows in Seoul. It does not represent all shows in the concert series.

 SKZ Awards corner
 SKZ Games corner
 "Spread My Wings"
 "District 9"
 "My Pace"
 "Get Cool"
 Photo Time: "Stray", "Saranghae"
 "Boxer"
 "Miroh"
Encore
 "Yayaya"
 "Grow Up"

Shows

Showcases

Unveil Tour "I Am…" (2019)

Their first showcase tour titled Unveil Tour "I Am…" was first announced on November 24, 2018, held in Thailand, and Indonesia in January 2019. and traveled to Australia, Philippines, the United States, and Europe, before ending in Japan in September.

Set list
This set list is representative of the January 19, 2019 shows in Bangkok. It does not represent all shows in the concert series.

Shows

Japan Showcase 2019 "Hi-Stay" (2019)

Stray Kids' announce their Japan Showcase 2019 "Hi-Stay" on November 9, 2019. It was held on December 3, 2019, at Yoyogi National Stadium 1st Gymnasium. In this event, the group also announce their Japanese debut compilation album SKZ2020.

Set list
This set list is representative of the December 3, 2019 show.

References

Stray Kids
Stray Kids
Concert tours